The Sam Athay House, located in Paris, Idaho, was listed on the National Register of Historic Places in 1982.

It was deemed "architecturally significant for its relatively unusual shape and distinct but-modest Queen Anne tendencies. Its design nearly follows that of the J. R. Shepherd house with octagonal projection, spindled porch, tapered posts and pedimental overdoor."

References

Houses on the National Register of Historic Places in Idaho
Bear Lake County, Idaho